Jacob Curtis Blackwood Jr. (born October 17, 1942) was a Republican member of the North Carolina General Assembly representing the state's sixty-eighth House district, including constituents in Union county.  A property manager from Matthews, North Carolina, Blackwood succeeded Fern Shubert when she left to run for North Carolina Senate. He decided not to run for another term in 2010.

Early life and education
Jacob Curtis Blackwood Jr. was born October 17, 1942, in Charlotte, North Carolina. He received his BA in History from the University of Georgia in 1965. He continued his studies at Ohio University receiving a Masters in Educational Administration in 1967 before returning to the University of Georgia and graduating with an EdD in 1972.

Prior to becoming a rental property owner and manager, Blackwood was an educator and school administrator from 1965 to 1983.

Political career

1996 Congressional campaign
Blackwood ran for Congress in 1996 against long-term incumbent Bill Hefner. That year, Blackwood's main primary opponent was car dealer Sherrill Morgan who was the Republicans' 1994 nominee to face Hefner. Morgan only lost by four percentage points in 1994 and was heavily favored to win the nomination to face Hefner again. Morgan did not get enough votes to avoid a run-off election and Blackwood won the run-off with almost 64% of the vote. He went on to lose the general election to Hefner.

1998 State senate campaign
Blackwood next sought to win a seat in the North Carolina Senate in 1998 in the 17th district. There were two seats available in the district and Blackwood along with fellow Republican Don Dawkins challenged incumbent Democrats Aaron Plyler and Bill Purcell. Both incumbents won re-election.

Recent electoral history

2008

2006

2004

2002

References

|-

1942 births
Living people
Republican Party members of the North Carolina House of Representatives
People from Union County, North Carolina
21st-century American politicians
Politicians from Charlotte, North Carolina
People from Matthews, North Carolina